Phtheochroa cistobursa is a species of moth of the family Tortricidae. It is found in Jalisco, Mexico.

References 

Moths described in 1991
Phtheochroa